Canistes is a genus of hidden snout weevils in the beetle family Curculionidae. There is one described species in Canistes, C. schusteri.

References

Further reading

 
 
 

Cryptorhynchinae
Articles created by Qbugbot